Tarek Farouk A. Abdelzaher is a Egyptian-born computer scientist.

Abdelzaher earned bachelor's and master's degrees in at computer and electrical engineering at Ain Shams University, followed by a doctorate from the University of Michigan in 1999, advised by Kang G. Shin. He is the Sohaib and Sara Abbasi Professor of Computer Science at the University of Illinois. Abdelzaher was chief editor of the Journal of Real-Time Systems for twenty years. In 2019, Abdelzaher was awarded fellow status by the Association for Computing Machinery. He was granted an equivalent honor by the IEEE in 2021, "for contributions to cyber-physical systems and real-time computing."

References

Living people
Year of birth missing (living people)
Egyptian computer scientists
Egyptian expatriates in the United States
Ain Shams University alumni
University of Illinois faculty
Academic journal editors
University of Michigan alumni
Fellows of the Association for Computing Machinery
Fellow Members of the IEEE